Tarun Gogoi constituted his first ministry and became the 13th Chief Minister of Assam on 17 May 2001.  Following the 2001 Assam Legislative Assembly election, Gogoi became Chief Minister succeeding AGP chief minister Prafulla Kumar Mahanta. There were 12 cabinet ministers and 4 ministers of state in the ministry.

Gogoi along with his cabinet was sworn in by governor Srinivas Kumar Sinha, succeeding Prafulla Kumar Mahanta as Chief Minister of Assam on 18 May 2001. The hour-long ceremony took place at Raj Bhavan at 14:00. Prafulla Kumar Mahanta and Bhubaneswar Kalita, who challenged Gogoi's claim to become Chief Minister in the wake of the election results, both did not attend the ceremony. No BJP or AGP legislators attended the ceremony either. Among those who attended were Congress General Secretary in charge of Assam Kamal Nath, AICC member Jagdish Tytler and several congress MPs from Assam.

The cabinet had two female ministers, including Hemoprova Saikia who was the wife of former Chief Minister Hiteswar Saikia. The cabinet also included former Chief Minister of Assam Bhumidhar Barman. 10 of the 17 ministers were ministers in previous congress governments in Assam. Gogoi stated that he held out hope for the newly elected MLAs, and stated that he would carry out an expansion of the ministry in a month. The expansion took place on 7 June 2002. The expansion included several newly elected MLAs including Robin Bordoloi, son of the first Chief Minister of Assam Gopinath Bordoloi, and Himanta Biswa Sarma who is the current Chief Minister of Assam.

During the ministry self employment schemes to counter terrorism, the Police Commission for smooth functioning of administration of State, the Chief Vigilance Commission to prevent corruption and the right to information bill were all established.

Cabinet Ministers

2002 Expansion 
On 7 June 2002, Gogoi expanded his ministry by including some new ministers. The previous ministers stayed as ministers apart from some ministers of state who were promoted.

References 

Assam ministries
Cabinets established in 2001
Indian National Congress state ministries
2001 in Indian politics